The 1918 United States Senate election in Iowa took place on November 5, 1918. Incumbent Republican Senator William S. Kenyon was re-elected to a second term in office over Democrat Charles Rollin Keyes.

General election

Candidates
William S. Kenyon, incumbent U.S. Senator since 1911 (Republican)
Charles Rollin Keyes, geologist and ornithologist (Democratic)

Results

See also 
 1918 United States Senate elections

References 

1918
Iowa
United States Senate